Beverly Wendland is the Provost and Executive Vice Chancellor for Academic Affairs at Washington University in St. Louis. 

Her laboratory investigates the molecular mechanisms and regulation of endocytic vesicle formation, using cell biology, genetic, and structural biology approaches. Wendland's research has successfully taken advantage of the highly genetically tractable eukaryote, the yeast Saccharomyces cerevisiae. Her research in yeast has advanced the molecular understanding of the cell biology underlying human cancer, cardiovascular disease, lysosomal-storage disorders and infections.

Education and early career 
Wendland earned her B.S. at the University of California, San Diego in 1986 and her PhD in neuroscience with Richard Scheller at Stanford University in 1993. She then conducted postdoctoral research with Scott Emr at the University of California, San Diego. 

In 1998, Wendland joined the faculty of the Department of Biology at Johns Hopkins University. During her time at Johns Hopkins, she received both the 1999 Burroughs Wellcome Fund's New Investigator Award in the Pharmacological Sciences and the March of Dimes Basil O'Connor Starter Scholar Research Award. She also received a joint appointment in the Department of Biophysics. In 2009, Wendland was named chair of the Department of Biology.

Deanship at Johns Hopkins 
On May 16, 2014, Wendland was selected to be interim dean of the Krieger School of Arts and Sciences after then-dean Katherine Newman announced she was accepting another position at the University of Massachusetts Amherst. 

On February 12, 2015, Wendland was appointed dean of the Krieger School of Arts and Sciences. She was recommended by Johns Hopkins President Ronald Daniels and then-Provost Robert Lieberman, and approved by the Johns Hopkins Board of Trustees. Later that year, Wendland was elected a fellow of the American Association for the Advancement of Science (AAAS).

As dean, Wendland raised $747 million for the Krieger School of Arts and Sciences and helped establish the SNF Agora Institute, which seeks to strengthen global democracy. Wendland also focused on personalizing the undergraduate student experience with the introduction of active learning techniques, small seminar courses, and additional research opportunities. Wendland has been credited with increasing the diversity of faculty and creating a more inclusive climate in the Krieger School of Arts and Sciences.

Provostship at Washington University 
On January 14, 2020, Wendland was named as the new Provost of Washington University in St. Louis, effective July 1, 2020.

References 

Year of birth missing (living people)
Living people
Washington University in St. Louis people
Stanford University alumni
University of California, San Diego alumni
Johns Hopkins University faculty
21st-century American biologists
American university and college faculty deans
Women deans (academic)
Johns Hopkins University administrators